The Muringura, or Murrinh-Kura, were an indigenous Australian people of the Northern Territory.

Country
According to Norman Tindale's estimate, the Muringura had some 800 sq. miles of territory in the area east of the Macadam Range, and running along the coastal swamps bordering the  around at the mouth of the Fitzmaurice River. Their northern borders lay on the Moyle River divide.

People and language
The Muringura spoke a distinct dialect, traces of which remain in the speech of descendants, after their group was assimilated into the larger Murrinh-Patha group.  .

Alternative names
 Murinkura.

Notes

Citations

References

Aboriginal peoples of the Northern Territory